Animal Farm is a 1999 political comedy-drama television film directed by John Stephenson and written by Alan Janes. Based on the 1945 novel of the same name by George Orwell and serving as an allegory of the Russian Revolution and its aftermath, the film features an ensemble cast including Kelsey Grammer, Ian Holm, Julia Louis-Dreyfus, Patrick Stewart, Julia Ormond, Paul Scofield, Charles Dale, Pete Postlethwaite, Alan Stanford and Peter Ustinov. In the film, a group of anthropomorphic animals revolt successfully against their own human owner, only to slide into a more brutal tyranny among themselves.

Plot
Mr. Jones, the cruel and rarely sober owner of Manor Farm, invites the Pilkingtons to a gathering he is hosting, wishing to talk about the debts he owes with Pilkington. During the gathering, the animals gather in a meeting where Old Major, the prize Middle White boar, explains to the animals that humanity is their enemy, and while the animals sing a song, Jones accidentally shoots Major while investigating.

Later, when Jones goes into town for a drink without feeding the animals, Boxer, a strong and kind-hearted shire horse, leads the animals to break into the food shed to help themselves. When Jones and his cronies investigate, the animals rebel against him, causing Jones to flee with his wife and men to the Red Lion Inn for refuge.

A boar named Snowball renames the place "Animal Farm" and puts down the Seven Commandments of "Animalism" which embody Old Major's feelings and ideas. Meanwhile, Napoleon, a Berkshire boar, calls for a secret meeting in which he has Pincher, one of the farm's dogs, swear loyalty to him and become part of the animal guard before ordering him to sneak out Jessie the border collie's newborn puppies, claiming that it is best for them to receive an education from him, despite Jessie's reluctance. The pigs also secretly begin hoarding the apples and milk for themselves.

Pilkington leads an attack into Animal Farm with the aid of other local farm workers led by Frederick, only to lose. Though he is defeated, Pilkington considers working with the animals instead. During a meeting, Snowball's plans to build a windmill to better the animals' lives and improve their operations are opposed by Napoleon, who summons Jessie's puppies (who are now grown up dogs working as his henchmen) to chase Snowball out of the farm. Napoleon decrees the pigs will decide the future and the animals begin the hard work of building the windmill with Boxer's help. Meanwhile, Pilkington hears over a microphone planted in the barn that the pigs can speak English and begins to trade with Napoleon. Later, Jessie reveals she saw the pigs living in the abandoned farmhouse and sleeping in the beds, though the commandment of sleeping in a bed being altered to not sleeping in a bed with sheets.

Jones conspires with his wife to sabotage Animal Farm by blowing up the almost-complete windmill with dynamite as revenge on the animals for taking his farm. Napoleon blames it on Snowball, pigs consume more food, and blame Snowball for the food shortage and that the hens will have to surrender their eggs to the market. When the hens oppose, Napoleon makes feeding a hen punishable by death. Squealer begins making propaganda films about Napoleon showing animals on trial for working with Snowball that are sentenced to death, as well as animals supposedly happy with Napoleon's rule. It is revealed that the alcohol and killing commandments were altered as well into "no animal shall drink alcohol to excess" and "no animal shall kill another animal without cause".

During the rebuilding of the windmill, Boxer is injured, and Jessie and Benjamin, a wise donkey, realize that the van taking Boxer is from the glue factory, causing everyone to unsuccessfully attempt to save him. Napoleon is paid by Pilkington for selling Boxer to the glue factory in exchange for more whiskey, and Squealer's latest propaganda film claims the van was previously the glue factory. That night, Jessie watches through a warped glass window as Pilkington and his wife dine with the pigs in the farmhouse. Napoleon then changes the farm's name back to Manor Farm. The animals can no longer tell the difference between them. Muriel the goat and Benjamin notice that the final commandment, "All animals are equal", has been extended to include "but some animals are more equal than others". Now seeing Napoleon and Squealer's evil nature, Jessie, Muriel, Benjamin and a few other animals sneak out before things can get any worse, while Napoleon (who now "fully resembles a human") enslaves the rest of the farm by falsely declaring all animals free.

Years later, during a disastrous rainstorm, the escapees return and investigate the remains of the now-destroyed Manor Farm. They find Napoleon and Squealer are long gone, having died from their own dictation, though a few animals have survived the fall, including Jessie's puppies (who all recognize her as their mother). Jessie finds out a new family has purchased the farm (although the whereabouts of Jones and his wife is unknown), and vows to not let them or each other go astray and make the same mistakes as Jones and Napoleon.

Cast

 Pete Postlethwaite as Jones, the original owner of Manor Farm who is overthrown by his own animals due to his abusive behaviour towards them, likely because of his drunkenness. He represents Czar Nicholas II. Postlethwaite also played Benjamin in the film.
 Caroline Gray as Mrs. Jones, Jones' shrewish wife.
 Alan Stanford as Pilkington, the owner of Foxwood Farm and neighbor of Jones who later works for Napoleon, thus is the only human who trades with him. He represents the British ruling class.
 Gail Fitzpatrick as Mrs. Pilkington, Pilkington's unfaithful wife.
 Gerard Walsh as Mr. Frederick, the owner of Pinchfield Farm. He represents Adolf Hitler.

Voices
 Julia Ormond as Jessie, a wise and virtuous Border collie who serves as the protagonist and the narrator of the film. She represents one of the oppressed masses under Stalin or under any other dictator. She is similar to Clover from the book.
 Kelsey Grammer as Snowball, a noble domestic pig who is in charge of Animal Farm after overthrowing Mr. Jones until he is later overthrown by his former ally Napoleon. He represents Leon Trotsky.
 Patrick Stewart as Napoleon, a greedy, sadistic and ruthless Berkshire boar and once a former ally of Snowball who succeeded in overthrowing Mr. Jones, only for him to later banish Snowball and becomes the tyrannical ruler of Animal Farm. He represents Joseph Stalin.
 Ian Holm as Squealer, a sinister and intelligent Tamworth pig who served as Napoleon's assistant and acts as the minister of propaganda. He represents Vyacheslav Molotov.
 Paul Scofield as Boxer, a large shire horse who, while kind-hearted, is also immensely strong and served as the gentle giant of all the animals. He represents Alexey Stakhanov.
 Pete Postlethwaite as Benjamin, a wise donkey and a friend of Boxer who is the oldest of all the animals. He represents the Menshevik intelligentsia. Postlethwaite also played Mr. Jones in the film.
 Julia Louis-Dreyfus as Mollie, a young mare who is obsessed with ribbons. She represents the petit bourgeoisie that fled from Russia a few years after the Russian Revolution.
 Peter Ustinov as Old Major, a benevolent Middle White boar who was the original ruler of Manor Farm until his death. He represents Karl Marx and Vladimir Lenin.
 Charles Dale as Moses, a dim-witted raven with a sense of humour and the former pet of Jones. He represents organized religion. 
 Dale also plays Pincher, a Rottweiler who serves as Napoleon's head of his personal guard and chief enforcer, thus is responsible for taking away Jessie's puppies so that Napoleon can raise them as his private security. He represents Lavrentiy Beria.
 Jean Beith as Muriel, an elderly Saanen goat.

Production

Filming began on 25 August 1998 and ended on 6 November. Because of the extensive CGI work and other post-production requirements, the film was not delivered to TNT and Hallmark Entertainment until June 1999.

Fourteen animals were built to represent the animals of Animal Farm at Jim Henson's Creature Shop in London: four pigs (Old Major, Snowball, Napoleon, and Squealer), two horses (Boxer and Mollie), a sheepdog (Jessie), a donkey (Benjamin), a raven (Moses), a goat (Muriel), a sheep, a rat, a chicken, a duck, a cat, and a dove.

Ten dogs were cast into the film from Fircroft Kennels. Their Border collie, Spice, played the role of Jessie.

In early screenplays done by Martyn Burke for this film, Jessie was set to be a male character, rather than a female.

Reception
The film received mixed reviews. It holds a 40% approval rating on Rotten Tomatoes, based on five reviews.
It was criticized for its loose adaptation of the book, its simplicity and lack of subtlety, and for being too dark and political for children while being too familiar and simplistic for adults.

The film won Best Special Effects and was nominated for best film in the 2000s Fantasporto International Fantasy Film Award.

The film's director John Stephenson was nominated for Starboy Award in the 2000s Oulu International Children's and Youth Film Festival.

References

External links

 

1999 films
Cold War films
Films based on Animal Farm
Films about death
Animated films based on novels
1999 comedy-drama films
Films with screenplays by Martyn Burke
1990s political films
Films scored by Richard Harvey
1999 television films
Films directed by John Stephenson (director)
1990s British films
British drama television films